The Stedelijk Museum Breda, formerly the Museum of the Image (MOTI), is a national museum for visual culture in Breda in the Netherlands. The museum focuses on film, design, photography, fashion, visual arts, architecture, science, and gaming.

MOTI closed from 1 January 2017 with the intention of reopening the building in spring 2017 as Stedelijk Museum Breda, a merger with Breda's Museum.

History 
Netherlands has been home to designers including Piet Zwart, Willem Sandberg, Wim Crouwel and Anthon Beeke. The Graphic Design Museum offers an international podium for established designers and new talent.

On January 1, 2008, The Beyerd became an independent organisation and was known as the Graphic Design Museum Beyerd Breda. The official reopening took place on 11 June 2008, in a dedication presided over by Queen Beatrix. On 9 December 2011 the museum changed its name to Museum Of The Image (MOTI).

The current director of the museum is artist/designer Mieke Gerritzen.

The museum has a partial 1963-1980 archive of the Total Design on loan (long-term) from the NAGO. The Graphic Design Museum is also Research institute, and has a shop, a café and an auditorium. Furthermore, the museum publishes its very own Museum Magazine, and has an education program for both Elementary schools as well as Academic Colleges.

Building 

MOTI is housed in one of the oldest buildings in Breda. Mention is first found of it in the archives of 1246 as a hospice in Breda. The function of a hospice at the time was to provide care and shelter to pilgrims and other strangers. The De Beyerd building lay just outside the built-up area on the road which led to Den Bosch. There was a city gate near to De Beyerd, which was known as the Hospice Gate. In 1956 it became a cultural centre, the Beyerd. Between 1980 and 2005 it remained a centre for the illustrative art, especially modern art.

The building has been a national heritage site (rijksmonument) since 1966.

Activities 
Besides the prominent exhibitions, the Graphic Design Museum also organizes multiple activities like tours, workshops and children's parties.

References

External links 

 

2008 establishments in the Netherlands
Art museums and galleries in the Netherlands
Art museums established in 2008
Design museums
Modern art museums
National museums of the Netherlands
Museums in North Brabant
Buildings and structures in Breda
21st-century architecture in the Netherlands